Rod Gantefoer  (born May 15, 1947) is a Canadian provincial politician. He was a member of the Legislative Assembly of Saskatchewan from 1995 to 2011, representing the constituencies of Melfort-Tisdale from 1995 to 2003 and Melfort from 2003 to 2011.

Originally elected as a Liberal, he became part of the Saskatchewan Party caucus in 1997. In April 1998, Gantefoer was a candidate for the Saskatchewan Party leadership, but was defeated on the second ballot by Elwin Hermanson.

After the Saskatchewan Party's victory in the 2007 election, he was appointed Minister of Finance and Government House Leader.

Gantefoer announced in February 2010 that he has been diagnosed with Parkinson's disease, and later announced that he would not run in the 2011 election. He was shuffled out of cabinet on June 29, 2010.

References

Living people
1947 births
People with Parkinson's disease
People from Melfort, Saskatchewan
Members of the Executive Council of Saskatchewan
Finance ministers of Saskatchewan
Saskatchewan Liberal Party MLAs
Saskatchewan Party MLAs
21st-century Canadian politicians